Drillia sinuosa is a species of sea snail, a marine gastropod mollusk in the family Drilliidae.

Drillia sinuosa McLean, J.H. & R. Poorman, 1971 is a junior homonym and is a synonym of Drillia macleani Tucker, J.K., 1992

Description
The length of the shell attains 18 mm.

The solid shell has a turreted shape, with a few prominent longitudinal ribs terminating at the periphery, crossed by close, strong striae. The aperture is broadly cut out below, with no proper siphonal canal. The large anal sinus is ascending. The color of the shell is white, or brownish with white ribs, or whitish indistinctly maculated or centrally banded with light brown.

Distribution
This species occurs in the Atlantic Ocean off St. Helena.

References

  Tucker, J.K. 2004 Catalog of recent and fossil turrids (Mollusca: Gastropoda). Zootaxa 682:1–1295

External links
 

sinuosa
Gastropods described in 1803